Seyar-e Vosta (also Romanized as Seyar-e Vosţá; also known as Seyar-e Vasaţ) is a village in Sahandabad Rural District, Tekmeh Dash District, Bostanabad County, East Azerbaijan Province, Iran. At the 2006 census, its population was 223, in 45 families.

References 

Populated places in Bostanabad County